Astakhov is a Russian masculine surname, its feminine counterpart is Astakhova. It may refer to

 Anna Astakhova (1886–1971), Soviet scholar
 Dmitri Astakhov (born 1986), Russian professional footballer
 Ernest Astakhov (born 1998), Ukrainian professional footballer
 Fedor Astakhov  (1892–1966), Soviet Marshal of Aviation Force
 Kristina Astakhova (born 1997), Russian pair skater
 Pavel Astakhov  (born 1966), Russian politician, celebrity lawyer and television personality.
 Polina Astakhova (1936–2005), Ukrainian artistic gymnast
 Vitali Astakhov (born 1979), Russian professional footballer

See also 
 Astakhov Glacier in Antarctica

Russian-language surnames